Carnival of Souls is an album by the American band Pere Ubu, released in 2014. The title is taken from the 1962 film, for which the band had created an underscore. "Irene" was released as a single.

Production
The album was written while Pere Ubu toured Europe in support of Lady from Shanghai. Darryl Boon joined the band on clarinet. In addition to the film, Pere Ubu was inspired by Van der Graaf Generator's Pawn Hearts.

Critical reception

Record Collector wrote that the album "scrapes up enough sporadic excellence to justify David Thomas’ perseverance in the 21st-century scheme of things." Greil Marcus, in The Believer, thought that the lead track "Golden Surf II" "shoots out like a flood, and then you can ride the wave of transmorgrification that sweeps over the whole album." The Milwaukee Journal Sentinel determined that the band "still challenges itself and its listeners on its unsettling, menacing circus of a latest disc."

AllMusic noted that "'Dr. Faustus', one of the album's most score-like pieces, combines metallic percussion, spare guitars and David Thomas' muttered vocals into something rustic and rickety, yet threatening at a moment's notice."

Track listing
All songs written and composed by Pere Ubu.

CD version

LP version

Side A
Golden Surf II - 4:10  
Strychnine 1 - 1:05  
Drag The River - 4:01  
Strychnine 2 - 1:00  
Visions Of The Moon - 3:33  
Strychnine 3 - 1:01  
Dr. Faustus - 4:22  
Side B
Strychnine 4 - 1:01  
Bus Station - 4:28  
Road To Utah - 4:20  
Carnival - 5:01  
Strychnine 5 - 1:00  
Irene - 4:13

References

Pere Ubu albums
2014 albums